The 1948–49 Norwegian 1. Divisjon season was the tenth season of ice hockey in Norway. Eight teams participated in the league, and Furuset IF won the championship.

Regular season

External links 
 Norwegian Ice Hockey Federation

Nor
GET-ligaen seasons
1948–49 in Norwegian ice hockey